Danell Nicholson (born November 15, 1967) is a former American Olympian and a boxer in the heavyweight division. He held the IBO World Heavyweight title in 1994, and in 2003 challenged Wladimir Klitschko for the WBA Intercontinental Heavyweight title.

Professional career

Amateur
Nicholson was a member of the 1992 United States Olympic Team as a Heavyweight. His results were:
Defeated Paul Lawson (Great Britain) 10-2
Defeated Zeljko Mavrovic (Croatia) 9-6
Lost to Félix Savón (Cuba) 13-11

Professional
He boxed professionally from 1992 to 2003 training under Emanuel Steward. Perhaps his best win as a professional was his split decision win over future heavyweight titlist John Ruiz on August 4, 1994. With that win came the lightly regarded International Boxing Organization heavyweight title. Other notable fighters he faced but to whom he lost were Andrew Golota, Kirk Johnson, David Tua, and Wladimir Klitschko.

Professional boxing record

|-
|align="center" colspan=8|42 Wins (32 knockouts, 10 decisions), 5 Losses (4 knockouts, 1 decision)
|-
| align="center" style="border-style: none none solid solid; background: #e3e3e3"|Result
| align="center" style="border-style: none none solid solid; background: #e3e3e3"|Record
| align="center" style="border-style: none none solid solid; background: #e3e3e3"|Opponent
| align="center" style="border-style: none none solid solid; background: #e3e3e3"|Type
| align="center" style="border-style: none none solid solid; background: #e3e3e3"|Round
| align="center" style="border-style: none none solid solid; background: #e3e3e3"|Date
| align="center" style="border-style: none none solid solid; background: #e3e3e3"|Location
| align="center" style="border-style: none none solid solid; background: #e3e3e3"|Notes
|-align=center
|Loss
|
|align=left| Wladimir Klitschko
|TKO
|4
|20/12/2003
|align=left| Kiel, Schleswig-Holstein, Germany
|align=left|
|-
|Win
|
|align=left| Ken Murphy
|TKO
|2
|14/06/2003
|align=left| Las Vegas, Nevada, U.S.
|align=left|
|-
|Win
|
|align=left| Sione Asipeli
|UD
|6
|23/03/2003
|align=left| Temecula, California, U.S.
|align=left|
|-
|Win
|
|align=left| Melvin Foster
|TKO
|4
|18/01/2002
|align=left| Las Vegas, Nevada, U.S.
|align=left|
|-
|Loss
|
|align=left| David Tua
|KO
|6
|23/03/2001
|align=left| Las Vegas, Nevada, U.S.
|align=left|
|-
|Win
|
|align=left| Reynaldo Minus
|TKO
|2
|04/11/2000
|align=left| New York City, U.S.
|align=left|
|-
|Win
|
|align=left| Tim Pollard
|KO
|2
|25/06/2000
|align=left| Elgin, Illinois, U.S.
|align=left|
|-
|Win
|
|align=left| Terrence Lewis
|TKO
|2
|31/03/2000
|align=left| New York City, U.S.
|align=left|
|-
|Win
|
|align=left| Tony LaRosa
|TKO
|2
|09/02/2000
|align=left| Rosemont, Illinois, U.S.
|align=left|
|-
|Win
|
|align=left| Marcellus Brown
|TKO
|2
|05/08/1999
|align=left| Tunica, Mississippi, U.S.
|align=left|
|-
|Win
|
|align=left| Abdul Muhaymin
|UD
|8
|17/06/1999
|align=left| Worley, Idaho, U.S.
|align=left|
|-
|Win
|
|align=left| Frankie Swindell
|UD
|10
|12/03/1999
|align=left| New York City, U.S.
|align=left|
|-
|Win
|
|align=left| Levi Billups
|TKO
|4
|07/01/1999
|align=left| Tunica, Mississippi, U.S.
|align=left|
|-
|Win
|
|align=left| Jimmy Haynes
|TKO
|1
|22/09/1998
|align=left| New York City, U.S.
|align=left|
|-
|Win
|
|align=left| Mike Sedillo
|PTS
|10
|03/09/1998
|align=left| Mashantucket, Connecticut, U.S.
|align=left|
|-
|Win
|
|align=left| Everett Martin
|TKO
|4
|16/06/1998
|align=left| Biloxi, Mississippi, U.S.
|align=left|
|-
|Win
|
|align=left| Everett Mayo
|TKO
|3
|31/01/1998
|align=left| Atlantic City, New Jersey, U.S.
|align=left|
|-
|Win
|
|align=left| Thomas Williams
|TKO
|2
|30/08/1997
|align=left| Buenos Aires, Argentina
|align=left|
|-
|Win
|
|align=left| Moses Harris
|TKO
|3
|26/04/1997
|align=left| Cicero, Illinois, U.S.
|align=left|
|-
|Win
|
|align=left| Marcos Gonzalez
|KO
|2
|03/04/1997
|align=left| Worley, Idaho, U.S.
|align=left|
|-
|Loss
|
|align=left| Kirk Johnson
|UD
|10
|23/08/1996
|align=left| Atlantic City, New Jersey, U.S.
|align=left|
|-
|Loss
|
|align=left| Andrew Golota
|TKO
|8
|15/03/1996
|align=left| Atlantic City, New Jersey, U.S.
|align=left|
|-
|Win
|
|align=left| Darren Hayden
|PTS
|8
|21/12/1995
|align=left| Bossier City, Louisiana, U.S.
|align=left|
|-
|Win
|
|align=left| Jesse Ferguson
|TKO
|8
|19/10/1995
|align=left| Las Vegas, Nevada, U.S.
|align=left|
|-
|Win
|
|align=left| Anthony Willis
|TKO
|6
|11/08/1995
|align=left| New Orleans, Louisiana, U.S.
|align=left|
|-
|Win
|
|align=left| Art Card
|KO
|2
|31/03/1995
|align=left| Detroit, Michigan, U.S.
|align=left|
|-
|Win
|
|align=left| William Morris
|TKO
|5
|07/03/1995
|align=left| Prior Lake, Minnesota, U.S.
|align=left|
|-
|Win
|
|align=left| Larry Davis
|TKO
|1
|10/02/1995
|align=left| Philadelphia, Pennsylvania, U.S.
|align=left|
|-
|Win
|
|align=left| Terry Anderson
|KO
|2
|19/01/1995
|align=left| Auburn Hills, Michigan, U.S.
|align=left|
|-
|Win
|
|align=left| John Basil Jackson
|TKO
|5
|20/12/1994
|align=left| Rosemont, Illinois, U.S.
|align=left|
|-
|Win
|
|align=left| John Ruiz
|SD
|12
|04/08/1994
|align=left| Mashantucket, Connecticut, U.S.
|align=left|
|-
|Win
|
|align=left| Mark Young
|UD
|10
|17/02/1994
|align=left| Joliet, Illinois, U.S.
|align=left|
|-
|Win
|
|align=left| David Graves
|PTS
|6
|06/12/1993
|align=left| Rosemont, Illinois, U.S.
|align=left|
|-
|Win
|
|align=left| Michael Greer
|TKO
|4
|27/08/1993
|align=left| Countryside, Illinois, U.S.
|align=left|
|-
|Win
|
|align=left| Phil Scott
|TKO
|2
|23/07/1993
|align=left| Countryside, Illinois, U.S.
|align=left|
|-
|Win
|
|align=left| Nick Kendrick
|KO
|1
|25/06/1993
|align=left| Countryside, Illinois, U.S.
|align=left|
|-
|Loss
|
|align=left| Jeremy Williams
|KO
|2
|08/05/1993
|align=left| Stateline, Nevada, U.S.
|align=left|
|-
|Win
|
|align=left| Tim Morrison
|TKO
|3
|26/04/1993
|align=left| Rosemont, Illinois, U.S.
|align=left|
|-
|Win
|
|align=left| Rocky Bentley
|KO
|3
|26/03/1993
|align=left| Countryside, Illinois, U.S.
|align=left|
|-
|Win
|
|align=left| Luis Torres
|KO
|3
|13/03/1993
|align=left| Aurora, Illinois, U.S.
|align=left|
|-
|Win
|
|align=left| Mark Posey
|KO
|1
|26/02/1993
|align=left| Countryside, Illinois, U.S.
|align=left|
|-
|Win
|
|align=left| Danny Blake
|UD
|6
|22/01/1993
|align=left| Countryside, Illinois, U.S.
|align=left|
|-
|Win
|
|align=left| Jordan Keepers
|KO
|1
|08/01/1993
|align=left| Chicago, Illinois, U.S.
|align=left|
|-
|Win
|
|align=left| James Holly
|KO
|1
|11/12/1992
|align=left| Countryside, Illinois, U.S.
|align=left|
|-
|Win
|
|align=left| Don Blake
|KO
|1
|25/11/1992
|align=left| Las Vegas, Nevada, U.S.
|align=left|
|-
|Win
|
|align=left| Dave Slaughter
|KO
|1
|23/10/1992
|align=left| Countryside, Illinois, U.S.
|align=left|
|-
|Win
|
|align=left| Dan Nieves
|UD
|4
|14/10/1992
|align=left| Rosemont, Illinois, U.S.
|align=left|
|}

References

External links
 
 HBO Boxing Archive

Living people
1967 births
Boxers from Chicago
Heavyweight boxers
Olympic boxers of the United States
Boxers at the 1992 Summer Olympics
American male boxers